Aylestone Park may refer to:
See Aylestone for Aylestone Park, Leicester, a housing estate, and Aylestone Meadows. Aylestone Park is an area of housing, approximately a mile square, which grew between Leicester City and Aylestone village and which has housing generally built since 1875.
Aylestone Park F.C., Leicester

Aylestone Park, Hereford.